Terre Thaemlitz is a musician, public speaker, and owner of the record label Comatonse Recordings. Thaemlitz's work critically combines themes of identity politics – including gender, sexuality, class, linguistics, ethnicity and race – with an ongoing critique of the socio-economics of commercial media production. This diversity of themes is matched by Thaemlitz's wide range of production styles, which include electroacoustic computer music, club-oriented deep house, digital jazz, ambient, and computer-composed neo-expressionist piano solos. Graphic design, photography, illustration, text and video also play a part in Thaemlitz's projects.

Activism
As a speaker and educator on issues of non-essentialist transgender, pansexual and queer sexuality, Thaemlitz has participated in panel discussions throughout Europe and Japan, as well as held numerous cross-cultural sensitivity workshops at Tokyo's Uplink Factory near Thaemlitz's current residence in Kawasaki, Japan.

Terre Thaemlitz's Soil and Tranquilizer releases in the early and mid-1990s served to introduce a "political" form of ambient music, continued in later releases such as Couture Cosmetique and Means from an End, which aim to recast the usually passive artist-listener-environment equation. Thaemlitz's colleagues in the political ambient music front include the sound activist group Ultra-red. Following their remixes of Thaemlitz's Still Life with Numerical Analysis in 1998, Ultra-red joined Thaemlitz on the German label Mille Plateaux for their first two albums: Second Nature: An Electroacoustic Pastoral (1999) and Structural Adjustments (2000).

Terre Thaemlitz published the essay collection Nuisance in 2015, which contained essays on identity and music written between 1996 and its year of publication. In the introduction, which was originally written in 2006, Thaemlitz writes, "My intention is to write in defense of pessimism, and to critically reject the incessant optimism lurking at the core of virtually all media, conferences, concerts, events and symposia – "critical media" or not."

Discography

Albums
Tranquilizer, Instinct Ambient, 1994, EX-283-2
Soil, Instinct Ambient, 1995, AMB:007-2
Die Roboter Rubato, Mille Plateaux, 1997, MP34
Couture Cosmetique, Caipirinha Productions, 1997 (US); Daisyworld Records, 1997 (Japan)
G.R.R.L., Comatonse Recordings, 1997, C.003
Means From An End, Mille Plateaux, 1999, MPCD53
Love For Sale, Mille Plateaux, 1999, MPCD53
Replicas Rubato, Mille Plateaux, 1999, MPCD71 and MPLP71
Fagjazz, Comatonse Recordings, 2000, C.007
Interstices, Mille Plateaux, 2000, MP94
Oh, No! It's Rubato, Mille Plateaux, 2001, MPCD103/MPLP103
Lovebomb / Ai No Bakudan, Mille Plateaux, 2003, MP117
Lovebomb / Ai No Bakudan, double disc DVD & audio CD re-issue, Comatonse Recordings, 2005, D.001
Trans-Sister Radio, Grain of Sound/Base Recordings, 2005, GOS018/BRCD00505
K-S.H.E (Kami-Sakunobe House Explosion): Routes Not Roots / Ruutsu De Ha Naku Ruuto, Comatonse Recordings, 2006, C.013.CD
Terre Thaemlitz presents... You? Again?, Mule Electronic, 2006, MED05
DJ Sprinkles: Midtown 120 Blues, Mule Musiq, 2008, MMD7
Terre Thaemlitz: Soulnessless, 2012
Where Dancefloors Stand Still, Mule Musiq, 2013, MMCD41

12" EPs
Comatonse.000, Comatonse Recordings, 1993, C.000 (contains "Raw Through A Straw" and "Tranquilizer")
Comatonse.000.R1, Comatonse Recordings, 1997, C.000.R1 (translucent vinyl re-issue of C.000 with previously unreleased outro "Pretty Mouth (He's Got One)")
Terre's Neu Wuss Fusion: She's Hard, Comatonse Recordings, 1998, C.004
DJ Sprinkles: Sloppy 42nds, Comatonse Recordings, 1998, C.006
DJ Sprinkles: Bassline.89, Comatonse Recordings, 2001, C.008
Social Material: Class/Consciousness, Comatonse Recordings, 2001, C.009
Terre's Neu Wuss Fusion: A Crippled Left Wing Soars With The Right, Comatonse Recordings, 2002, C.010
Teriko: Hystoric Trace ("Fake"), Hysteric Trace, 2003, INEX-002
The Opposite Of Genius Or Chance, EN/OF, 2003, EN/OF 013
Comatonse.000.R2, Comatonse Recordings, 2004, C.000.R2
K-S.H.E (Kami-Sakunobe House Explosion): Route 1 EP, Comatonse Recordings, 2006, C.013.EP1
K-S.H.E (Kami-Sakunobe House Explosion): Route 2 EP, Comatonse Recordings, 2006, C.013.EP2
K-S.H.E (Kami-Sakunobe House Explosion): Route 3 EP, Comatonse Recordings, 2006, C.013.EP3
You? Again? 1, Mule Electronic, 2006, M019
You? Again? 2, Mule Electronic, 2006, M020
You? Again? 3, Mule Electronic, 2006, M025
Terre's Neu Wuss Fusion: She's Hard Remixes, Mule Musiq, 2007, MM019
DJ Sprinkles: Grand Central, Pt. I, Mule Musiq, 2008, MM033
DJ Sprinkles: Brenda's $20 Dilemma (Kuniyuki Remix), Mule Musiq, 2009, MM034
DJ Sprinkles: Grand Central (Motor City Drum Ensemble Remixes), Mule Musiq, 2009

7" singles
A-MUSAK, Germany: A-Musik, 1999, A-14
Selling, Netherlands: Bottrop-Boy, 2000, B-BOY 003
Chugga: A Big 7-Inch, Austria: Klanggallerie, 2003, GG73

DJ mixes
DJ Sprinkles: DEEPERAMA (Module Party 5), Japan: Comatonse Recordings, 2003, DCM5
DJ Sprinkles' DEEPERAMA (Module Party 8), Japan: Comatonse Recordings, 2004, DCM8
PASTIME PARADISE, Japan: Comatonse Recordings, 2004, DPP1
DJ Sprinkles' DEEPERAMA (Module Party 9), Japan: Comatonse Recordings, 2004, DCM9
DJ Sprinkles' DEEPERAMA (Module Party 10), Japan: Comatonse Recordings, 2004, DCM10
DJ Sprinkles' DEEPERAMA (Module Party 14), Japan: Comatonse Recordings, 2005, DCM14

Collaborations
Web, Subharmonic, 1995 (with Bill Laswell)
Yesterday's Heroes: 1979 (with Haco), France: La Louche qui Fait déborder le Vase, 2004, LOUCH 001
Complete Spiral 12", Comatonse Recordings, 2012 (with Mark Fell)
Fresh Insights 12", Comatonse Recordings, 2015 (with Mark Fell)

Internet-only releases
 Below Code, Comatonse Recordings, 2006, C.012

To celebrate the 10th anniversary of Comatonse Records, Thaemlitz released a free best-of compilation CD. Physical copies are no longer in print, but MP3s are available for free (along with a bonus track that did not fit on the original release) through Comatonse.

Radio dramas
 Trans-Sister Radio – Germany: Hessischer Rundfunk Radio, Channel HR2, Frankfurt M, 2004. Premier airdate November 17, 2004. Hörspiel, Redaktion: Manfred Hess. Also released on CD (Portugal: Grain of Sound/Base Recordings, 2005, GOS018/BRCD00505).

 The Laurence Rassel Show (with Laurence Rassel) – Germany: Hessischer Rundfunk Radio, Channel HR2, Frankfurt M, 2006. Premier airdate April, 2006. Hörspiel, Redaktion: Manfred Hess.

Filmography
 ffwd_mag (DVD + magazine)
Italy: .::invernomuto::., 2005, Issue 3. Audio and photography.
 Lovebomb / Ai No Bakudan (full-length film/music videos)
Written, directed, filmed and edited by Terre Thaemlitz. 
Originally released on VHS (Japan: Comatonse Recordings, 2003, V.002). In English and Japanese.
Japan: Comatonse Recordings, 2005/2003, D.001.NTSC | D.001.PAL.

 Interstices (short film/music videos)
Written, directed, filmed and edited by Terre Thaemlitz. 
Commissioned by Lovebytes and funded by the Arts Council of England. Released with "Silent Passability" on DVD (Japan: Comatonse Recordings, 2005, D.000.NTSC). Originally released on VHS (Japan: Comatonse Recordings, 2001, V.001) and DVD ("Volatile Media," UK: Lovebytes, 2002, DSP2).
Japan: Comatonse Recordings, 2005/2001, D.000.NTSC.
 Silent Passability (Ride to the Countryside) (music video)
Written, directed, filmed and edited by Terre Thaemlitz. Released with Interstices on DVD (Japan: Comatonse Recordings, 2005, D.000.NTSC). Originally released on VHS (US: Comatonse Recordings, 1997, V.000). Japan: Comatonse Recordings, 2005/1997, D.000.NTSC.
 Modulations (documentary)
Directed by Iara Lee, produced by George Gund III, (US: Caipirinha Productions, 1998). Interview.
 Neue Kraft, Neues Werk (Transcodeur Express) (documentary)
Directed by Ninon Liotet and Olivier Schulbaum, (Germany: ZDF 2002). Interview and music.
 Synthetic Pleasures (documentary)
Directed by Iara Lee, produced by George Gund, (US: Caipirinha Productions, 1995). Three tracks featured on soundtrack. Sound engineering for trailer.

Awards
 Album of the Year 2009, for DJ Sprinkles – Midtown 120 Blues, Resident Advisor
 Honorable Mention In Digital Musics, 1999 ORF Prix Ars Electronica
 Best Ambient/Experimental Artist 1997, 1997 Readers' Poll results in URB Magazine (US: March/April 1998)
 Best DJ 1991, Underground Grammy Award from the House of Magic, Midtown Manhattan drag circuit

References

External links
 Terre Thaemlitz – official site
 
 Comatonse Recordings – Terre Thaemlitz record label

1968 births
Living people
American electronic musicians
Ambient musicians
American LGBT musicians
LGBT people from Minnesota
Transgender musicians
LGBT DJs
American women in electronic music
Political music artists
Deep house musicians